The Stamp Duty Ordinance is one of Hong Kong Ordinances which regulates the law of stamp duty.

Some notable sections of the ordinance 

 Section 2 - Interpretation: This section introduce the terms always appear in this ordinance. The examples are Hong Kong bearer instrument, Hong Kong stock, conveyance, contract note.
 Section 4 - Charging of, liability for, and recovery of stamp duty
 Section 8 - Duplicates and counterparts
 Section 9 - Late stamping
 Section 10 - How instruments to be written, charged and stamped
 Section 13 - Adjudication of stamp duty by Collector
 Section 14 - Appeal against assessment
 Section 15 - Non-admissibility, etc. of instruments not duly stamped
 Section 16 - Provisions relating to certain leases etc.
 Section 18I - Power of Collector to inspect instrument or evidence
 Section 19 - Contract notes, etc. in respect of sale and purchase of Hong Kong stock
 Section 22 - Stamp duty chargeable where consideration in respect of immovable property consists of stock or security other than stock
 Section 24 - Stamp duty chargeable where conveyance etc. is in consideration of debt etc.
 Section 29H - Exemptions and relief
 Section 31 - Duty of trustees and managers to keep records
 Section 45 - Relief in case of conveyance from one associated body corporate to another: regulate relief between parent companies and subsidiaries.
 Section 53 - Liability for offences by bodies corporate
 Section 54 - Inspection of books of account etc.
 Section 56 - Offences relating to stamps
 Schedule 1 - The Hong Kong stamp duty heading
 Head 1: All transactions of sale or lease of interests in Hong Kong immovable property.
 Head 2: The transfer of Hong Kong Stock.
 Head 3: All Hong Kong bearer instruments.
 Head 4: Any duplicates and counterparts of the above documents.

References

External links
 

Taxation in Hong Kong
Hong Kong legislation
Tax legislation